is a Japanese politician of the Liberal Democratic Party (LDP) who is the current member of the House of Representatives for Yamagata 3rd district.

Kato was elected in the 2014 Japanese general election to the same seat as her father Koichi Kato, a longtime member of the House of Representatives for Yamagata Prefecture who had lost the seat in the 2012 general election. From 2006 to 2009, Kato was married to LDP politician Kensuke Miyazaki, who later served as member for Kyoto 3rd district from 2012 to 2016.

References

1979 births
Living people
People from Yamagata Prefecture
21st-century Japanese women politicians
Members of the House of Representatives (Japan)
Liberal Democratic Party (Japan) politicians
21st-century Japanese politicians